is a railway station on the Kagoshima Main Line, operated by JR Kyushu in Gyokutō, Kumamoto, Japan.

Lines 

Layout 
The station consists of a side and an island platform serving three tracks with a siding. The station building is a wooden structure in traditional Japanese style and serves as a local community interaction space. Access to the island platform is by means of a footbridge. The station is unstaffed by JR Kyushu but some types of tickets are available from a kan'i itaku agent on site who manages the ticket window.

Adjacent stations

History
Konoha was opened a few months later, on 1 April 1892, as an additional station on the track between Takase (now  and Kumamoto. When the Kyushu Railway was nationalized on 1 July 1907, Japanese Government Railways (JGR) took over control of the station. On 12 October 1909, the station became part of the Hitoyoshi Main Line and then on 21 November 1909, part of the Kagoshima Main Line. With the privatization of Japanese National Railways (JNR), the successor of JGR, on 1 April 1987, JR Kyushu took over control of the station.

Passenger statistics
In fiscal 2016, the station was used by an average of 375 passengers daily (boarding passengers only), and it ranked 278th among the busiest stations of JR Kyushu.

References

External links
Konoha Station (JR Kyushu)

Railway stations in Kumamoto Prefecture
Railway stations in Japan opened in 1892